Spike was a British comics anthology that ran from 22 January 1983 to 28 April 1984. Published by D. C. Thomson & Co. Ltd, it was a traditional 'action comic for boys', with many of its strips revolving around football, athletics, school, war, sci-fi, espionage and mystery. After just 67 issues it merged with Champ comic in May 1984.

Strips published in the comic

 The Spike Report concerning the adventures of Spike, a rebellious teenager, with a hatred of authority. Drawn by artist Brian Walker.
 Iron Barr about an incredibly talented working class amateur goalkeeper, and scrap-metal merchant, named Charlie Barr, (similar in concept to Tough of the Track).
 The Man In Black a story revolving around the fictional legendary British athlete, William Wilson.
 The Bleak Street Bunch a Grange Hill school-style serial dealing with contemporary issues in the fictional town of Slagley.
 Ticker Tait an espionage story about a British secret agent with a bomb implanted in his heart.
 Midshipman Coward a tale about a sailor boy.
 The Taming Of Johnny Tough a story about a teenage boy who is trained (by unorthodox methods) to be a top British footballer.
 Powerbeast a science fiction, serial set in the 26th century, about an evil entity intent on destroying the universe.
 Krazy Kops a comedy comic strip about incompetent police officers, which had originally appeared in Sparky under the name L Cars.

External links
 downthetubes guide to Spike

DC Thomson Comics titles
Comics magazines published in the United Kingdom
Magazines established in 1983
Magazines disestablished in 1984
1983 comics debuts
1984 comics endings
Association football comics
Defunct British comics